Endemol Shine UK (branded as EndemolShine UK and formerly Endemol UK Ltd) is a British production company. Since 2020, the company has been a subsidiary of Banijay.

Endemol Shine UK incorporates a number of production brands, including Artists Studio, Darlow Smithson Productions, House of Tomorrow, Initial, Remarkable Television (previously Brighter Pictures and Cheetah Television), Tiger Aspect, Tigress Productions, Zeppotron, and their digital divisions: Endemol Games and Endemol Digital Studio.

With the advent of a joint venture with 21st Century Fox, additional companies under the new Endemol Shine UK umbrella include Dragonfly, Kudos, and Princess Productions (now defunct). The various television production brands specialize in a broad range of genres including entertainment, reality series, drama series, specialist factual, arts, live events, music entertainment, documentaries, youth shows, and comedy.

In the United Kingdom, Endemol is mostly known for producing both Big Brother (2000–2018) and Celebrity Big Brother (2001–2018).

History
The UK branch of Endemol originated from Peter Bazalgette's sale of his television company Bazal to the Guardian Media Group (GMG) in 1990. In September 1998, Endemol acquired a 50% stake and the division was named GMG Endemol. Endemol bought the company outright from GMG in August 2000.

Since 2000, a series of corporate owners and public stock transactions has culminated in the joint venture of 2014 with 21st Century Fox's Shine Group to form the rebranded Endemol Shine UK, effective January 2015.

In January 2016, Endemol UK acquired the short-form and branded content production house Electric Robin and the digital talent management firm OP Talent.

On 30 June 2020, the European Commission approved Banijay's purchase of Endemol Shine UK's parent company Endemol Shine Group. The purchase was completed on July 3.

Credits
The subsidiary which produced the show is listed in the bracket.

1 vs 100 (Initial)
101 Ways to Leave a Gameshow (Initial)
8 Out of 10 Cats (Zeppotron)
All Together Now (Remarkable Television)
The Bank Job (Remarkable Television)
Big Brother (UK) (Endemol UK Productions)
Black Mirror (Zeppotron (2011–2013)/House of Tomorrow (2014–2019))
Celebrity Big Brother (Endemol UK Productions)
Cell
Deal or No Deal (Endemol West (2005-2006)/Cheetah Television West (2006-2009)/Remarkable Television (2009-2016))
Fear Factor (Endemol UK Productions)
Gala TV (Endemol West)
The Games (Endemol UK Productions (2003–05)/Initial (2006))
The Gap Year
The Wall (Remarkable Television)
Golden Balls (Initial)
The House that £100k Built (Remarkable Television)
Hunted (Shine TV)
Let's Play Darts (Zeppotron)
The Match (Endemol UK Productions)
The Million Pound Drop Live (Remarkable Television)
Only Fools on Horses (Zeppotron)
Pointless (Brighter Pictures (2009)/Remarkable Television (2010-present))
Ready Steady Cook (Bazal Productions (1994–2001)/Endemol UK Productions (2002–06)/Cheetah Television West (2006–10)/Remarkable Television (2020–))
Restoration (Endemol UK Productions)
Restoration Home (Remarkable Television)
Richard Osman's House of Games (Remarkable Television)
Signs of Life
Soccer Aid (Initial)
Starstruck (Remarkable Television)
Total Wipeout (Initial)
Two Tribes (Remarkable Television)
UK Music Hall of Fame (Endemol UK Productions)
Your Face Sounds Familiar (Initial)

Awards and nominations

References

External links
 Endemol Shine UK
 Zeppotron
 Cheetah Television (AVID wiki) - company information and logos

Endemol
Banijay
Television production companies of the United Kingdom
Mass media companies established in 1983
Companies based in the London Borough of Hammersmith and Fulham
British companies established in 1983